Roman Loktionov (born on 18 October 1986) is a Ukrainian retired football forward.

Club history
He previously played for the club FC Zirka Kropyvnytskyi.

References

External links
 Official team website for FC Kremin Kremenchuk (Ukr)
 
 

1986 births
Living people
People from Oleksandriia
Ukrainian footballers
Association football forwards
Ukrainian Premier League players
Ukrainian First League players
Ukrainian Second League players
Ukrainian expatriate footballers
Expatriate footballers in Belarus
Ukrainian expatriate sportspeople in Belarus
MFC Olexandria players
FC Kremin Kremenchuk players
FC Vorskla Poltava players
FC Oleksandriya players
FC Stal Alchevsk players
FC Zirka Kropyvnytskyi players
FC Neman Grodno players
FC Inhulets Petrove players
FC Cherkashchyna players
FC LNZ Cherkasy players
FC Kremin Kremenchuk managers
Ukrainian First League managers
Ukrainian football managers
Sportspeople from Kirovohrad Oblast